The  is the 7th edition of the Japan Film Professional Awards. It awarded the best of 1997 in film. The ceremony took place on March 28, 1998, at Theatre Shinjuku in Tokyo.

Awards 
Best Film: Cure
Best Director: Takashi Miike (Gokudō Kuro Shakai Rainy Dog, Young Thugs: Innocent Blood)
Best Actress: Naomi Nishida (My Secret Cache)
Best Actor: Yoshio Harada (Onibi)
Best Supporting Actor: Masato Hagiwara (Cure)
Best New Encouragement: Sarina Suzuki (Young Thugs: Innocent Blood)
Best New Encouragement: Maki Sakai (Gozonji! Fundoshi Zukin)
Best New Encouragement: Yasue Sato (Bounce Ko Gals)
Special: Kazuyoshi Okuyama (For his achievement as producer.)

10 best films
 Cure (Kiyoshi Kurosawa)
 Koi Gokudō (Rokurō Mochizuki)
 Postman Blues (Sabu)
 Onibi (Rokurō Mochizuki)
 Young Thugs: Innocent Blood (Takashi Miike)
 Unagi (Shohei Imamura)
 Tetsu to Namari (Kazuhiro Kiuchi)
 2/Duo (Nobuhiro Suwa)
 Raigyo (Takahisa Zeze)
 Tettō Musashino-sen'' (Naoki Nagao)

References

External links
  

Japan Film Professional Awards
1998 in Japanese cinema
Japan Film Professional Awards
March 1998 events in Asia